Zbigniew Pakleza (born 5 December 1986) is a Polish chess Grandmaster and a streamer.

Chess career
Zbigniew Pakleza is a multiple medalist of the Polish Junior Chess Championship: 2002 (U16) - silver, 2001 (U16) - bronze. He represented Poland at the World Junior Chess Championship and European Youth Chess Championship. In 2002 won bronze medal in European Youth Chess Championship (U16) in Peniscola. In 2004 won the team gold medal at the Polish Junior Team Chess Championships. In 2007 shared 1st place (with Kevin Spraggett) in San Sebastián. In 2007 and 2008 shared 1st place in Open tournaments in Sitges. Zbigniew Pakleza has also competed successfully in several Polish Team Chess Championships (individual gold in 2008 and bronze in 2006, 2007). In 2014 shared 1st place in Rethymno chess tournament.

References

External links

1986 births
Living people
Polish chess players
Chess grandmasters